"Do It for Love" is the title track of the 2003 album by Hall & Oates. Having first appeared on the 2002 VH1 Behind the Music: The Daryl Hall and John Oates Collection compilation, the track was written by Daryl Hall and John Oates, along with Billy Mann and Paul Pesco. It was the duo's 8th number one hit of their career and the first number one on the Adult Contemporary chart, spending two weeks at the top in September 2002. It didn't crack the Billboard Hot 100 Pop chart but managed to reach number fourteen on the Bubbling Under Hot 100 Singles chart.

See also
List of Billboard Adult Contemporary number ones of 2002

References

2002 singles
2002 songs
Hall & Oates songs
Songs written by Daryl Hall
Songs written by Paul Pesco
Songs written by John Oates
Songs written by Billy Mann